

436001–436100 

|-id=048
| 436048 Fritzhuber ||  || Fritz Huber (1958–2015) was a leading member of the core team of the first solar-powered observatory in Oberreith, Bavaria, Germany. || 
|}

436101–436200 

|-id=149
| 436149 Edabel || 2009 VL || Ed Abel (born 1944) is an active member of the Mountain Meadows, West Virginia, astronomy group. This is a community of advanced amateur astronomers that purchased adjacent mountaintop properties for their telescopes/observatories, see CBA-MM Observatory . It is one of the few remaining dark sites near the East Coast of the US. || 
|}

436201–436300 

|-bgcolor=#f2f2f2
| colspan=4 align=center | 
|}

436301–436400 

|-bgcolor=#f2f2f2
| colspan=4 align=center | 
|}

436401–436500 

|-bgcolor=#f2f2f2
| colspan=4 align=center | 
|}

436501–436600 

|-bgcolor=#f2f2f2
| colspan=4 align=center | 
|}

436601–436700 

|-bgcolor=#f2f2f2
| colspan=4 align=center | 
|}

436701–436800 

|-bgcolor=#f2f2f2
| colspan=4 align=center | 
|}

436801–436900 

|-bgcolor=#f2f2f2
| colspan=4 align=center | 
|}

436901–437000 

|-bgcolor=#f2f2f2
| colspan=4 align=center | 
|}

References 

436001-437000